Arriaga is a Basque surname that may refer to:

Agustín Arriaga Rivera (1925–2006), Mexican politician
Emmanuel Arriaga (born 1991), Mexican footballer
Eudalio Arriaga (born 1975), Colombian footballer
Genaro Ruiz Arriaga (born 1955), Mexican politician
Guillermo Arriaga (born 1958), Mexican author, screenwriter, and producer
Guillermo Arriaga Fernández (1926–2014), Mexican dancer, choreographer, and composer
Ignacio J. Pérez Arriaga (born 1948), Spanish engineer
Jesus Arriaga (1858-1885), 19th century Mexican bandit
Fr. Joaquín Sáenz y Arriaga, S.J. (1899–1976), Mexican theologian, sedevacantist
Joseba Arriaga (born 1982), Spanish footballer
Juan Crisóstomo Arriaga (1806–1826), Basque-Spanish composer
Justino Arriaga Rojas (born 1979), Mexican politician
Kaúlza de Arriaga (1915-2004), commander of Portuguese troops in the Mozambican War of Independence
Lucrécia de Arriaga (1844–1927), First Lady of Portugal
Manuel de Arriaga (1840–1917), president of Portugal
Marcia Arriaga (born 1955), Mexican swimmer
Mercedes Arriaga Flórez (born 1960), Spanish philologist and writer
Pablo José Arriaga (1564–1622), Spanish Jesuit missionary
Ponciano Arriaga (1811–1865), Mexican politician
Ramón Arriaga (born 1990), Mexican footballer
Rodrigo de Arriaga (1592–1667), Spanish Jesuit philosopher and theologian
Sonia Arriaga, Mexican bioengineer
Tereza de Arriaga (1915–2013), Portuguese painter

See also
Arriaga (disambiguation)

References

Basque-language surnames